Alex Jeffries (born 27 April 1995) is a Welsh rugby union player who plays as a prop forward. He currently plays for Ospreys in the Pro14

Career

Club
Jeffries has played senior rugby in the Welsh Premier Division for Newport RFC, Bedwas and Cross Keys and was part of the Newport Gwent Dragons squad. He was also part of the Newport Gwent Dragons academy.

Jeffries signed for Ospreys in 2016 and made his first team debut on 25 January 2018 alongside Cai Evans.

International
Jeffries was part of the Wales U18 squad that competed in the 2013 FIRA-AER tournament in Grenoble, France. He scored 2 tries in the final game against Georgia U18.

Jeffries was part of the Wales U20 squad that competed in the 2015 Six Nations Under 20s Championship.

References

External links
Newport Gwent Dragons Profile
Welsh Rugby Union Profile
Newport RFC Profile
Bedwas RFC Profile
Cross Keys RFC Profile

Welsh rugby union players
Rugby union players from Newport, Wales
Dragons RFC players
Newport RFC players
Cross Keys RFC players
1995 births
Living people
People educated at West Monmouth School
Ospreys (rugby union) players
Scarlets players
Saracens F.C. players
Rugby union props